The Ghana Revenue Authority (GRA) is the Ghana administration charged with the task of assessing, collecting and accounting for tax revenue in Ghana. The core mandate of the Authority is to ensure maximum compliance with relevant laws in order to ensure a sustainable revenue stream for government as well as the controlled and safe flow of goods across the county’s borders.

As part of efforts to improve compliance, the Authority is required to assist taxpayers to understand and meet their tax obligations by providing robust and comprehensive advice.

Since its inception the GRA has integrated the four revenue institutions namely the Customs, Excise and Preventive Service (CEPS), the Internal Revenue Service (IRS), the Value Added Tax Service (VATS) and the Revenue Agencies Governing Board (RAGB).

History
In December 2009, the four revenue agencies that is CEPS, IRS, VAT Service and RAGB Secretariat were merged in accordance with the Ghana Revenue Authority Act, 2009 (Act 791).  GRA thus replaces the revenue agencies in the administration of taxes and customs duties in the country.

The establishment of the GRA is part of the reforms in revenue administration of tax collection in Ghana which began in the mid-eighties when CEPS and IRS were taken out of the Civil Service and made semi- autonomous and self-accounting public sector institutions with separate boards. The National Revenue Secretariat (NRS) was set up to formulate revenue policies, manage tax reforms and supervise the activities of CEPS and IRS.

In 1998, the VAT Service was established to administer VAT and other consumption taxes. RAGB also began operations in 2001 to supervise and monitor the operations of the revenue agencies. In 2002, the Taxpayer Identification Number (TIN) was introduced to enhance information interchange and risk profiling. Then in 2004, the Large Taxpayer Unit (LTU) was set up to operate on functional lines as a pilot programme for the future integration of tax administration in Ghana as well as to serve the needs of large taxpayers as a one-stop-shop operation.

It was envisaged that the integration of the revenue agencies will bring the following benefits to taxpayers and the revenue administration.
 Reduced administrative and tax compliance cost
 Better service delivery
 Improved departmental information flow.
 Holistic approach to domestic tax and customs administration 
 Enhanced revenue mobilisation

Organizational structure
A nine-member governing Board of Directors, consisting of both public and private sector experts, makes policy decisions to be implemented by GRA Management. The Board also makes recommendations to the Minister of Finance on tax policy, reforms and legislations.

The Chairman of the Board as well as the Chief Executive Officer of the Authority called the Commissioner-General are appointed by the President of the Republic of Ghana.

The Authority has three main divisions, namely Customs Division (CD) Domestic Tax Revenue Division (DTRD) and Support Services Division (SSD) which are all headed by Commissioners.

Functions
Ghana Revenue Authority has been charged to perform amongst others, the following functions as enacted by Act 791:

 Assess and collect taxes, interest and penalties on taxes due to the state with optimum efficiency;
 Pay the amounts collected into the Consolidated Fund
 Promote tax compliance and tax education;
 Combat tax fraud and evasion and co-operate to that effect with other competent law enforcement agencies and revenue agencies in other countries;
 Advise District Assemblies on the assessment and collection of their revenue;
 Prepare and publish reports and statistics related to its revenue collection;
 Make recommendations to the Minister on revenue collection policy

Tax policy environment
Tax revenue generation is based on clearly defined tax policy measures. GRA remains a key partner of the Tax Policy Unit of the Ministry of Finance and Economic Planning (Ghana). This collaboration which is complemented by tapping the expertise of stakeholders drawn across several economic and social sectors is geared toward formulation of effective and sustainable policies designed to enhance tax revenue collection by the Authority.

Taxpayers
Taxpayers registered with GRA are segmented into three identifiable groups that is Large, Medium and Small based on defined criteria. Taxpayers with an annual turnover of over GH¢5 million are classified as large taxpayers. This category also includes specialist industries irrespective of their turnover. These are upstream and midstream petroleum companies, banking institutions, insurance companies, mining companies and quarries, and members of groups of companies where at least one member qualifies as a large taxpayer.

Taxpayers within the turnover bracket of GH¢90,000 up to GH¢5million are categorized as medium taxpayers while those with an annual turnover of less than GH¢90,000 are classified as small taxpayers.

Introduction of Uni-Pass clearance system 
On 21 February 2020,personnel and logistics were distributed by the Customs Division, to test the Uni-Pass clearance system at the Takoradi Port. This system handles all paperwork and payments at one point, an improvement on the previous system, which processed all the operations in several offices. This was after its successful implementation at the Aflao Collection Point in the Volta region.

References

Ministries and Agencies of State of Ghana
Revenue services